Jessica Hopper (born September 5, 1976) is an American writer. She published The First Collection of Criticism by a Living Female Rock Critic, a compilation of her essays, reported pieces, zines, and reviews, in May 2015. In 2018, she published a memoir, Night Moves.

Early life
Jessica Hopper was born in Indiana and grew up in Minneapolis. Her mother was a newspaper editor, her father a journalist and her stepfather a prosecutor, all of which Hopper has described as fueling her interest in journalism and investment in finding the truth more generally. She began writing criticism as a teenager, spurred by a frustrated sense that a magazine had misunderstood one of her favorite bands, Babes in Toyland—the piece, Hopper recalled later, characterized the music as "caustic and shrieky" where Hopper found "these aesthetics...really empowering"—at 15 Hopper called the magazine to argue they should publish new review written by her. The magazine didn't respond, but Hopper started her own fanzine. By the next year, at 16, she began freelancing for alternative weekly City Pages.

A feminist punk, Hopper was encouraged by music critic Terri Sutton to find her own "staunch and caustic and uncompromising" voice.

Career
Since then, Hopper has written for publications including the Chicago Tribune, The Chicago Reader, and Spin. She was a music supervisor for This American Life and the first music editor of the radical teen-girl webzine Rookie. From 1991 to 2005, she published the fanzine Hit It Or Quit It.

Alongside her writing, Hopper worked in public relations and managing bands until her late 20s when she quit to write full-time.

Hopper was a senior editor of Pitchfork and the editor in chief of the print quarterly The Pitchfork Review from October 2014 until November 2015. She was appointed editorial director of music for MTV News in 2016.

Writing in The Guardian, Laura Snapes described Hopper as "one of a handful of music journalists whose every new piece feels like an event. When Björk's latest album Vulnicura leaked in January, it was Hopper’s interview that provided the record's heartbreaking context." In Paste, Mack Hayden described Hopper's as "one of the most distinctive voices in the world of music criticism."

In 2018, Hopper published a memoir called Night Moves.

Personal life
Hopper is based in Chicago. She has two sons.

Bibliography
The Girls' Guide to Rocking: How to Start a Band, Book Gigs, and Get Rolling to Rock Stardom  (June 4, 2009) . Workman Publishing
The First Collection of Criticism by a Living Female Rock Critic (May 12, 2015)  , Featherproof Books
Night Moves (September 18, 2018) , University of Texas Press

References

Rock critics
American women journalists
American music critics
American women critics
Journalists from Minnesota
Writers from Minnesota
20th-century American non-fiction writers
20th-century American women writers
21st-century American non-fiction writers
21st-century American women writers
Living people
1976 births